Babylon is the fourteenth studio album by American heavy metal band W.A.S.P., released on October 12, 2009. The album was inspired by biblical visions of "The Four Horsemen of the Apocalypse". The album contains covers of Deep Purple's "Burn" (originally recorded for W.A.S.P's previous album Dominator, but not used for unknown reasons) and Chuck Berry's "Promised Land". "Promised Land" was also covered in 1973 by Elvis Presley, and it was Elvis' version that the band had in mind as demonstrated by the ending comment "How about one of them peanut butter & banana sandwiches."

Track listing 
All music and lyrics by Blackie Lawless, except where noted.

Personnel 
W.A.S.P.
 Blackie Lawless – lead vocals, rhythm & lead guitars, keyboards, producer
 Doug Blair – lead & rhythm guitars
 Mike Duda – bass, vocals
 Mike Dupke – drums, mixing assistant

Production
Marc Moreau - engineer
Logan Mader - mixing and mastering

Charts

References 

W.A.S.P. albums
2009 albums
Albums produced by Blackie Lawless